Broken record commonly refers to a skipping record, or to a person who, similarly, keeps repeating the same thing.

Broken Record may also refer to:

Music
Broken Records (band), an indie folk band from Edinburgh, Scotland
Broken Records (record label), a Christian record label

Albums
Broken Record (Lloyd Cole album), 2010; see Lloyd Cole discography
Broken Record, a 2019 album by gospel singer Travis Greene
Broken Record (EP), a 2013 EP by Jayme Dee

Songs
"Broken Record" (Katy B song), a 2011 song by Katy B from the album On a Mission
"Broken Record" (Little Boots song), 2013
"Broken Record", a 2017 song by Alex Mendham & His Orchestra from the album On With The Show 
"Broken Record", a 2012 song by Call Me No One from the album Last Parade
"Broken Record", a 2011 song by Corey Smith
"Broken Record", the title song by Jayme Dee from the aforementioned EP of the same name
"Broken Record", a 2010 song by Plain White T's from the album Wonders of the Younger
"Broken Record", a 1998 song by The Posies from album Alive Before the Iceberg
"Broken Record", a 2014 song by Shakira from the album Shakira
"Broken Record", a song by Van Morrison from Versatile 2017
"Broken Records", a song by Eric Burdon from the album My Secret Life

Other uses
 Broken record (assertiveness), a technique of Systematic Assertiveness Therapy
 A world record (or other similar record) that has been surpassed
 Broken Record, the autobiography of Roy Campbell, 1934
 Broken Record (film), a 2014 British film